Tom Hindle (22 February 1921 – 15 August 2011) was an English footballer who played as a winger in The Football League for Leeds United, York City, Halifax Town, and Rochdale. Towards the end of his career, he also played in the Lancashire Combination for Wigan Athletic and Nelson.

Born in Keighley, West Yorkshire, Hindle started his career in the local leagues before joining Leeds United from Keighley Town in September 1943.

References

1921 births
2011 deaths
Sportspeople from Keighley
English footballers
Association football wingers
Leeds United F.C. players
English Football League players
York City F.C. players
Halifax Town A.F.C. players
Rochdale A.F.C. players
Wigan Athletic F.C. players
Nelson F.C. players